61st Brigade may refer to:

 61st Stryamska Mechanized Brigade (Bulgaria)
 61st Mountain Troops Brigade (Romania)
 61st Naval Infantry Brigade (Russia)
 61st Mixed Brigade (Spain)
 61st Jager Infantry Brigade (Ukraine)
 61st Infantry Brigade (United Kingdom)